Stephen Ettien (born 10 April 1988) is a French professional footballer who plays as a midfielder for French club Aussonne Football.

Career
Ettien spent his early career in France with Balma, Cugnaux and Lyon.

He signed for Scottish club Hamilton Academical in August 2008, making his debut for the club in September 2008. In total he made 8 appearances for Hamilton in all competitions, scoring one goal. He moved on loan to Brechin City in January 2009, scoring 4 goals in 14 League appearances for them. Ettien was released from his contract with Hamilton in 2009.

He later played back in France with Toulon and US Colomiers.

In January 2019, Ettien joined futsal team TMFC. Six months later, he left the team to join Etoile Aussonnaise Football.

References

External links
Stephen Ettien at Footballdatabase

1988 births
Living people
Footballers from Toulouse
French footballers
Balma SC players
Olympique Lyonnais players
Hamilton Academical F.C. players
Brechin City F.C. players
SC Toulon players
US Colomiers Football players
Blagnac FC players
Scottish Premier League players
Scottish Football League players
Championnat National players
Championnat National 2 players
Championnat National 3 players
Association football midfielders
French expatriate footballers
French expatriate sportspeople in Scotland
Expatriate footballers in Scotland